The Chiricanu is a right tributary of the river Neajlov in Romania. It flows into the Neajlov in Crevedia Mare.

References

Rivers of Romania
Rivers of Dâmbovița County
Rivers of Giurgiu County